Marita Sturken (born 1957) is an American scholar, author, professor, and critic.

Life and work 
Marita Sturken is Professor and former Chair of the Department of Media, Culture, and Communication at New York University's Steinhardt School of Culture, Education, and Human Development, where she teaches courses on cultural studies, visual culture, popular culture, cultural memory, and consumerism. She focuses primarily on visual culture and the politics of cultural memory in American culture. Before coming to NYU she was an associate professor at the Annenberg School for Communication at the University of Southern California. She has published essays in Representations, Public Culture, Social Text, Afterimage, Journal of Visual Culture, Memory Studies, International Journal of Communication, American Ethnologist, History and Theory, and Positions, and was the editor of American Quarterly from 2003-2006.  She has a Ph.D. (1992) from the History of Consciousness program at the University of California, Santa Cruz.  In the 1980s and 1990s, she was a critic of independent film and video.

She is author of Tourists of History: Memory, Kitsch, and Consumerism from Oklahoma City to Ground Zero (2007), and Tangled Memories: The Vietnam War, the AIDS Epidemic, and the Politics of Remembering (1997), and co-author of Practices of Looking: An Introduction to Visual Culture (2001; Second Edition, 2009). While working as a critic in the 1980s she wrote a series of articles for Afterimage magazine documenting the early history of video art and community video.

Works
 Tourists of History: Memory, Kitsch, and Consumerism from Oklahoma City to Ground Zero (Durham and London: Duke University Press, 2007)
 Co-Author (with Lisa Cartwright) of Practices of Looking: An Introduction to Visual Culture (New York: Oxford University Press, 2001; Second Edition, 2009).
 Co-editor (with Douglas Thomas and Sandra Ball-Rokeach) of Technological Visions: The Hopes and Fears that Shape New Technology (Philadelphia: Temple University Press, 2004).
 Thelma & Louise (London: British Film Institute, 2000)
 Tangled Memories: The Vietnam War, the AIDS Epidemic, and the Politics of Remembering (Berkeley: University of California Press, 1997)

Notes

1957 births
Living people
New York University faculty
University of Southern California faculty